Thomas Drechsel (born 15 January 1987, in Berlin) is a German actor.

Drechsel is best known for his portrayal of Max "Tuner" Krüger in the German soap Gute Zeiten, schlechte Zeiten.

Filmography

References

External links 
 

1987 births
Living people
Male actors from Berlin
German male television actors
German male soap opera actors
German male film actors